Cladorhizidae is a family of demosponges which are carnivorous and prey on crustaceans and other small animals.  They are deep sea sponges typically found on oceanic ridges and seamount systems.  As of 2017, nine new species have been discovered in the Southwest Indian Ocean Ridge (SWIOR) including: Abyssocladia boletiphora, Ab. corniculiphora, Ab. hemiradiata, Asbestopluma (Asbestopluma) unguiferata, As. (A.) jamescooki, As. (A.) laminachela, As. (A.) pseudoisochela, As. (A.) ramuscula and Chondrocladia (Meliiderma) rogersi.

These discoveries have proven to show that this family of unique sponges is much more diverse than originally known.

Genera
The World Register of Marine Species includes the following genera:

Abyssocladia Lévi, 1964
Abyssosdiskos Ekins, Erpenbeck, Goudie & Hooper, 2020
Asbestopluma Topsent, 1901
Axoniderma Ridley & Dendy, 1886
Bathytentacular Ekins, Erpenbeck, Goudie & Hooper, 2020
Cercicladia Rios, Kelly & Vacelet, 2011
Chondrocladia Thomson, 1873
Cladorhiza Sars, 1872
Euchelipluma  Topsent, 1909
Koltunicladia  Hestetun, Vacelet, Boury-Esnault, Borchiellini, Kelly, Rios, Cristobo & Rapp, 2016
Lollipocladia Vacelet, 2008
Lycopodina Lundbeck, 1905
Nullarbora Ekins, Erpenbeck, Goudie & Hooper, 2020

References 

 
Sponge families